Yayuk Basuki (born 30 November 1970) is an Indonesian former professional tennis player who is now a politician. She is the highest-ever ranked tennis player from Indonesia, having reached No. 19 in singles in the WTA rankings in October 1997. She retired from playing singles in 2000, but remained an active doubles player on the circuit until 2013.

She sat in the Indonesian House of Representatives between 2014 and 2019. In January 2018, she was elected Chair of the Indonesian Olympian Association (IOA) for a four-year term. She unsuccessfully ran for re-election in 2019.

Sporting career
She began playing tennis at the age of seven and turned professional in 1990. In 1991, she became the first Indonesian player to win a major professional tennis event when she captured the singles titles at Pattaya. She won six WTA Tour singles titles during her career (all of them in Asia). Her best singles performance at a Grand Slam event came at Wimbledon in 1997, where she reached the quarterfinals by defeating Ai Sugiyama, Inés Gorrochategui, Naoko Kijimuta and Patricia Hy-Boulais before losing to Jana Novotná.

During her career, she has recorded wins over Amélie Mauresmo, Mary Joe Fernández, Lindsay Davenport, Gabriela Sabatini, Magdalena Maleeva, Anke Huber, Iva Majoli, Anna Kournikova, Zina Garrison, and Mary Pierce. Probably her greatest triumph was over Iva Majoli when the Croatian was the French Open champion. She also became only the second Indonesian woman to win the Asian Games singles gold medal, after Lita Liem Sugiarto in 1974, when she defeated Tamarine Tanasugarn in Bangkok at the 1998 games. She was the first player to be beaten by Lindsay Davenport in the main draw of a Grand Slam tournament, at the US Open in 1992.

She represented Indonesia at the Summer Olympic Games in 1988, 1992, 1996 and 2000. 1992 in Barcelona, she defeated Mercedes Paz and Mary Pierce to reach the third round of the singles competition, where she was beaten by Jennifer Capriati.

She is also a successful doubles player, often pairing with Nana Miyagi and later Caroline Vis, and reached the top 10 (No. 9 on 6 July 1998). She won nine tour doubles titles, the most significant of which was the Canadian Open in 1997 and qualified for the season-ending WTA Championships as one of the best eight teams of the year three times, 1996–98. Her best result in doubles competition at a Grand Slam event was in the 1993 US Open, where she and partner Nana Miyagi reached the semifinals.

In the mixed doubles, Basuki reached the quarterfinals at the French Open in 1995 with Kenny Thorne as her partner. In 1997, she reached the same stage at Wimbledon, this time paired with Tom Nijssen.

Her career-high world rankings were world No. 19 in singles and No. 9 in doubles.

Basuki is now a coach, tennis commentator for TV and print media and a consultant to the sports minister. She also was a WTA Tour mentor to rising Indonesian star Angelique Widjaja.

Basuki retired from the professional circuit in 2004, but in March 2008 she made a return to the ITF Circuit playing exclusively in doubles, and has since won six more ITF titles. She won the $10k event at Bangkok in June with Indonesian-born Australian Tiffany Welford. In August, she won the Hechingen, Germany with compatriot Romana Tedjakusuma and yet another $25k title, this time in Augusta, Georgia, in October, again with Tedjakusuma. In the first tournament she played in 2009, the $25k Balikpapan event in Indonesia, she and Tedjakusuma won the doubles competition. In May 2009, she won consecutive $25k events in Goyang and then Gimhae, both in the Korean Republic, and again, both with Tedjakusuma.

Basuki played in the doubles at the 2010 Australian Open, partnering Kimiko Date-Krumm, losing in the first round to Sania Mirza and Virginia Ruano Pascual.

In 2011, Basuki played in three WTA and five ITF tournaments. She successfully represented Indonesia in the Fed Cup, winning four matches with partner Jessy Rompies to see Indonesia back into the Asia/Oceania Group I. Her most recent appearance in a WTA Tour event was in September 2011 at the Guangzhou International Open, in which she and partner Lu Jingjing reached the quarterfinals.

As of December 2012, her most recent appearance in a professional tournament was in the $25k event in Phuket in March 2012. She and partner Kao Shao-yuan reached the quarterfinals of the doubles competition. In 2013, she retired from the tour to pursue a career as a politician.

Political career
In the 2014 Indonesian parliamentary election, she stood for a seat in the DPR with the National Mandate Party (PAN) from Central Java I electoral district. She was elected and sat on Commission X focusing on education, sports, and history. In the 2019 election, Basuki again ran as a legislative candidate in the same electoral district. However, the party did not win enough votes and therefore she lost her seat in the parliament.

Awards
 WTA Sportsmanship Award, 1996 and 1998
 Female Rookie of the Year 1991, TENNIS Magazine
 Indonesian Athlete of the Year 1991
 Nominated as Most Impressive Newcomer 1991, WTA Tour
 Special Award from President Soeharto of Indonesia for outstanding contribution to sports, 1991

Personal life
She married her coach and mixed-doubles partner Hary Suharyadi, with whom she won gold at the 1990 Asian Games, on 31 January 1994. On 23 September 1999, she gave birth to her first child, Yary Nara Sebrio Suharyadi. She returned to playing on the tour the following year.

WTA career finals

Singles: 8 (6 titles, 2 runner-ups)

Doubles: 17 (9 titles, 8 runner-ups)

ITF Circuit finals

Singles: 5 (5 titles)

Doubles: 36 (25 titles, 11 runner–ups)

National representation

Asian Games

Singles

Performance timelines

Singles 
<div style="overflow: auto;">

1 includes ITF tournaments.
2 The sum of wins/losses by year records from the WTA website does not add up to the career record presented on the same website.

Doubles
<div style="overflow: auto;">

1 includes ITF tournaments.
2 The sum of wins/losses by year records from the |WTA website does not add up to the career record presented on the same website.

Grand Slam mixed doubles

Career earnings

 * as of 12 April 2009
 # does not include mixed-doubles earnings (which are included in the career total)

References

External links
 
 
 
 
Basuki gets to say goodbye – Article on CNN/SI.com

1970 births
People from Yogyakarta
Living people
Indonesian female tennis players
Olympic tennis players of Indonesia
Tennis players at the 1988 Summer Olympics
Tennis players at the 1992 Summer Olympics
Tennis players at the 1996 Summer Olympics
Tennis players at the 2000 Summer Olympics
Asian Games medalists in tennis
Tennis players at the 1986 Asian Games
Tennis players at the 1990 Asian Games
Tennis players at the 1994 Asian Games
Tennis players at the 1998 Asian Games
Tennis players at the 2010 Asian Games
Asian Games gold medalists for Indonesia
Asian Games silver medalists for Indonesia
Asian Games bronze medalists for Indonesia
Medalists at the 1986 Asian Games
Medalists at the 1990 Asian Games
Medalists at the 1994 Asian Games
Medalists at the 1998 Asian Games
Southeast Asian Games gold medalists for Indonesia
Southeast Asian Games silver medalists for Indonesia
Southeast Asian Games bronze medalists for Indonesia
Southeast Asian Games medalists in tennis
Competitors at the 2001 Southeast Asian Games
20th-century Indonesian women